Mohd Asri bin Muda (10 October 1923 – 28 August 1992) was a Malaysian politician who served as the President of the Pan-Malaysian Islamic Party (PAS) from 1969 to 1982, and as the Menteri Besar (Chief Minister) of Kelantan.

Early and personal life
Asri was born on 10 October 1923 in Kota Bharu, the capital of Kelantan. He was a school teacher and journalist before entering politics. He was elected to the Kelantan State Assembly and the federal House of Representatives in the 1959 election. He married to Sakinah Junid on August 15, 1948 and has 9 children, 2 males and 7 females, namely Noordianauli Asri, Husni Zaim, Ratna Inzah, Mutia Sabihah, Naliyah, Khalidah, Nasibah, Najah and Mohd Taqiuddin

Menteri Besar of Kelantan
Asri became the Menteri Besar of Kelantan in 1964, replacing Ishak Lotfi Omar. He served as Menteri Besar until 1974, when he resigned to become a Minister in the federal government.

PAS Presidency
Under Asri's leadership, PAS became a member of the governing Barisan Nasional (BN) coalition for the first and only time, from 1973 to 1978. Asri became the Minister for Land and Rural Development in the BN government. Asri's leadership was also notable for the shifting of PAS's outlook towards Malay nationalism. Both joining the BN coalition and moving away from religious-based policy platforms caused the party to lose support. In 1982, Asri was ousted as PAS leader by the religious ulama faction of the party, to be replaced by Yusof Rawa. After Asri's tenure, PAS shifted to a more radical religious platform.

After PAS
Following his loss of the PAS presidency, Asri refrained from joining the United Malays National Organisation (UMNO) or Pan-Malaysian Islamic Front (BERJASA), decided to form his own Muslim People's Party of Malaysia or Parti Hizbul Muslimin Malaysia (HAMIM) in 1983 but failed to achieve any electoral success. He resigned from HAMIM together with other party representatives on 17 November 1988 after his attempt to dissolve HAMIM in an Extraordinary Muktamar failed. In 1988, he finally joined PAS's rivals, the UMNO, claiming that PAS had "deviated" and had been "infiltrated by extremist foreign elements".

Honours

Honours of Malaysia
  :
  Recipient of the Malaysian Commemorative Medal (Gold) (PPM) (1965)
  Commander of the Order of the Defender of the Realm (PMN) – Tan Sri  (1992)
  :
  Commander of the Order of the Crown of Kelantan (PMK) (1963)
  Knight Grand Commander of the Order of the Crown of Kelantan (SPMK) – Dato' (1965)
 Dato' Sri Paduka Raja (1969)
  :
  Grand Commander of the Order of Kinabalu (SPDK) – Datuk Seri Panglima (1974)

See also
 1978 Malaysian general election
 Parti Hizbul Muslimin Malaysia (HAMIM)

References

1923 births
1992 deaths
People from Kelantan
Malaysian political party founders
Presidents of Malaysian Islamic Party
Former Malaysian Islamic Party politicians
Parti Hizbul Muslimin Malaysia politicians
United Malays National Organisation politicians
Members of the Kelantan State Legislative Assembly
Kelantan state executive councillors
Chief Ministers of Kelantan
Members of the Dewan Rakyat
Government ministers of Malaysia
Malaysian Leaders of the Opposition
Commanders of the Order of the Defender of the Realm
20th-century Malaysian politicians